The 1923 Giro d'Italia was the 11th edition of the Giro d'Italia, a Grand Tour organized and sponsored by the newspaper La Gazzetta dello Sport. The race was won by the Italian rider Costante Girardengo of the Maino team. Second and third respectively were the Italian riders Giovanni Brunero and Bartolomeo Aymo.

This year saw the debutant Ottavio Bottecchia finish in 5th place overall, and the leading 'isolate' (rider without a team). Bottecchia caught the attention of French rider Henri Pélissier, who instigated his glorious Tour de France career.

Participants

Of the 96 or 97 riders that began the Giro d'Italia on 23 May, 38 of them made it to the finish in Milan on 10 June. Riders were allowed to ride on their own or as a member of a team. There were three teams that competed in the race: Atala, Legnano, and Maino.

The peloton was completely composed of Italians. The field featured two former Giro d'Italia champions in the 1919 Giro d'Italia winner Costante Girardengo and returning champion Giovanni Brunero. Other notable Italian riders that started the race included Bartolomeo Aymo, Ottavio Bottecchia, Angelo Gremo, and Giovanni Rossignoli.

Final standings

Stage results

General classification

There were 38 cyclists who had completed all ten stages. For these cyclists, the times they had needed in each stage was added up for the general classification. The cyclist with the least accumulated time was the winner. Ottavio Bottecchia won the prize for best ranked independent rider in the general classification.

Notes

References

1923
Giro d'Italia
Giro d'Italia
Giro d'Italia
Giro d'Italia